Gary Steven a/l Robbat (born 3 September 1992) is a Malaysian professional footballer player who plays as a defensive midfielder for Malaysia Super League side Sabah.

Club career

Harimau Muda
In 2008, Robbat was promoted to newly created Harimau Muda from Bukit Jalil Sport School. He was later being put in Harimau Muda A after the team was split into two teams. In 2010, Harimau Muda A went to a training camp in Zlaté Moravce, Slovakia for eight months. On 30 March 2010, Robbat and Mohd Muslim Ahmad were given a trial by the Slovakian team FC ViOn Zlaté Moravce. Zlaté Moravce coach Ľubomír Moravčík promised Muslim and Robbat a professional contract for the 2010–11 season. However, Zlaté Moravce lost interest in Muslim and Robbat. In 2011, Robbat played in the Malaysia Super League where Harimau Muda A finished in fifth place. In 2012, he played in the Singapore S. League as Harimau Muda finished in fourth place. Robbat got his second European stint as Harimau Muda A went to Slovakia for a centralised training camp in 2013. In 2014, he played in Australia's National Premier Leagues. He scored a goal against Redlands United FC as his team lost 3–2.

Johor Darul Ta'zim
After the end of 2014 season, Robbat along with Harimau Muda teammate D. Saarvindran confirmed that they would be joining Pahang FA next year. Johor Darul Takzim later announced that Robbat has signed for them. Although he never signed a contract with Kedah FA, KFA president, Datuk Seri Mukhriz Mahathir claimed robbat belong to their team and wanted him to return to his home state. According to Mukhriz, the FAM rule state that any Harimau Muda player whose contract expires with the national junior squad will return to their respective state teams first. On 16 January 2015, Robbat has been banned for three months and fined RM50,000 by the Football Association of Malaysia for signing contracts with two Super League teams.

On 26 January 2015, Johor Football Association confirmed that Robbat will be heading to Germany to train with Borussia Dortmund. Robbat, who has been suspended from all football activities under the Football Association of Malaysia's jurisdiction for three months, will spend the duration of the suspension in Germany.

International career
Robbat has represented Malaysia U-21 and U-23 level. He was included in Malaysia's U-23 squad for 2010 Asian Games in Guangzhou, China and 2014 Asian Games in Incheon, South Korea. Robbat was also part of the Malaysian senior squad for AFF Championship in 2012 and 2014.

Career statistics

Club

1 Includes AFC Cup and AFC Champions League.

International

Honours

Club
Johor Darul Ta'zim
 Malaysia Cup (2): 2017, 2019
 Malaysia Super League (5): 2015, 2016, 2017, 2018, 2019
 AFC Cup (1): 2015
 Malaysia Charity Shield (3): 2016, 2018, 2019

International
Malaysia
 AFF Championship runner-up: 2014

References

External links

1992 births
Living people
Malaysian footballers
People from Kedah
Malaysian sportspeople of Indian descent
Johor Darul Ta'zim F.C. players
Sabah F.C. (Malaysia) players
Malaysia Super League players
Association football midfielders
Expatriate footballers in Singapore
Expatriate soccer players in Australia
Footballers at the 2010 Asian Games
Footballers at the 2014 Asian Games
Asian Games competitors for Malaysia
AFC Cup winning players
Malaysia international footballers